Kostyra is a surname. Notable people with the surname include:

Eugene Kostyra (born 1947), Canadian politician 
Martha Stewart (née Kostyra in 1941), American businesswoman, writer, and television personality